Horizon Worlds (formerly Facebook Horizon) is a free virtual reality, online video game with an integrated game creation system developed and published by Meta Platforms. On this multi-player virtual platform, players move and interact with each other in various worlds that host events, games, and social activities. The game works on Oculus Rift S and Meta Quest 2 headsets.

In February 2022, Meta reported Horizon Worlds had an estimated 300,000 users; yet, by October 2022, The Wall Street Journal was reporting less than 200,000 monthly users. Horizon Worlds has received mixed reviews, with critics citing bugs and an unenjoyable environment that degrades the user experience.

Gameplay
The game may be played with an Oculus Rift S or Meta Quest 2 virtual reality headset and uses full 3D motion via the motion capture system of the headset and two hand-held motion controllers, which are required to interact with objects in the game. In October 2022, Meta announced that they will be launching a web version, allowing users to access the game without a headset as well. Players can explore the space around them within the confines of their physical floor-space, while roaming further by using controller buttons to teleport a short distance or to move continuously through the virtual space.

According to Meta, users can create their own avatar, with a custom face and outfit, to represent themselves in the virtual world. All players begin at the hub (also known as the “plaza”), where they can take portals to different worlds created by other users. An integrated game creation system allows users to create new worlds. Users can also create their own personal space, which is a world private to only them. The game’s website lists other features such as taking a picture within the game, joining a party with friends, and blocking users.

Venues 

Part of Horizon Worlds is a world named Venues which is used for live events such as concerts or sports games. Meta has formed multiple partnerships to be able to show various content.
 On October 13, 2022, the UFC announced a partnership with Meta. Users with a UFC Fight Pass will be able to watch live and on-demand events on Horizon Worlds. The UFC debuted the live, virtual reality events on Horizon Worlds with LFA 144 on October 14, 2022.
 Horizon Worlds will stream live music events as part of its partnership with Tidal, as announced by Meta on October 25, 2022. The platform will stream a live concert series featuring artists who are part of Tidal's emerging artist platform called Tidal Rising.
 On January 23, 2023, Meta announced an extended partnership with NBA which allows Horizon Worlds users to watch NBA games for free. It also added a dedicated NBA Arena.

Development
The development of Horizon Worlds (formerly called Facebook Horizon) followed earlier social VR apps by Facebook (Oculus Rooms, Oculus Venues, and Facebook Spaces) and focused more on user-generated content than these earlier apps. Facebook announced Facebook Horizon as a new social virtual world at the Oculus Connect 6 conference in September 2019.
In August 2020, Facebook announced that more users will receive access to an invite-only beta phase. In an interview with Scott Stein in January 2021, Facebook Reality Labs head Andrew Bosworth conceded that the experiences in Facebook Horizon are not ready for the public and expressed concern that "[i]f you don't have… something driving a lot of people to the place, then you run the risk they're not going to get it." 

In August 2021, Facebook released the open beta of Horizon Workrooms, a collaboration app targeted at teams managing remote-work environments. The app offers virtual meeting rooms, whiteboards and video call integration for up to 50 people. On 7 October 2021 Facebook changed the name Facebook Horizon to Horizon Worlds. After an invite-only beta phase, the game was released in the U.S. and Canada to people 18 years or older on December 9, 2021.

In February 2022, Mark Zuckerberg stated that a mobile phone version of Horizon Worlds would launch later in 2022. He has also announced plans for Horizon Worlds to expand to the web.

In March 2022, Meta announced “Builder Tracks for Horizon Worlds”, a developer program for game development inside Horizon Worlds. Meta has pledged $500,000 to fund the program, including cash prizes, a Horizon Worlds bootcamp, and support from Meta developers.

In April 2022, Meta started testing monetization in Horizon Worlds in the form of in-app purchases, where a few select creators began selling virtual items, such as clothing, to players 18 years and older. Meta also started testing the Horizon Worlds Creator Bonus program where creators are paid monthly bonuses.

Geographic availability

Reception

Critics 
When Horizon Worlds was first announced in 2019 under the name Facebook Horizon, Josh  writing for TechCrunch compared it to other social virtual worlds such as Second Life, The Sims, AltspaceVR, Dreams, Roblox, as well as the fictional "OASIS" described in the novel Ready Player One, while Sam Machkovech writing for Ars Technica emphasised similarities to Rec Room and VRChat. Machkovech noted a key difference to other social virtual worlds in Facebook's plan to let employees welcome new users. Sean Bowles from Apply Digital praised the platform for its ability to create monetization opportunities through partnerships. However, he also criticized the centralized nature of Meta’s control over the game, along with the clunkiness of the graphics and lack of social engagement. Scott Stein writing for CNET agreed that "[m]aybe Horizon is better than whatever Oculus had before"; however, he also observed that "there are a lot of social VR questions Horizon leaves unanswered". 

David H. Freedman writing for Newsweek tried to answer some of these questions by predicting that Facebook's knowledge about users' online behavior "will explode when someone straps on a Facebook headset". This prediction is supported by Facebook's public plans to include face and eye tracking in future headsets. Freedman speculated that Facebook could use this knowledge to generate advertising revenue with ads that permeate Facebook Horizon and "might appear as billboards, signage, skywriting, computer-generated characters hawking goods and services, logos embedded in objects and surfaces, and any other form that can be crammmed into any nook or cranny of fake reality."

Kotaku described Horizon Worlds as "a strange experience" and that the overall vibe felt "less toxic than [they] expected, considering how awful Facebook is", and also called it a "hollow, corporate shell that has more in common with an office than it does a playground, or any other type of social space a human being would willingly want to hang out in." TheGamer also described Horizon Worlds as "less of a virtual utopia, and more of a glitchy, incomplete cluster of experiences" and criticized the current relative lack of safety features and poor management of misinformation and hate speech on the platform and described it as a "corporate reality that only investors and venture capitalists are seeking."

Vishal Shah, VP of Metaverse at Meta, commented that users and creators have provided feedback to the team about the lack of stability and prevalence of bugs in the platform. Shah also found that company employees have also stopped using the platform, writing, “The simple truth is, if we don’t love it, how can we expect our users to love it?". However, other executives have urged critics to be patient with the developing technology, and have stated that Meta is currently working towards improvements.

Users 
In February 2022 Meta stated that Horizon Worlds and Horizon Venues had a total monthly userbase of 300,000 people, that users had built 10,000 worlds within Horizon Worlds, and that its private Facebook group for creators had over 20,000 members.

In an October 2022 report, the Wall Street Journal stated that most users of Horizon Worlds only stay on the platform for a month, ending their interactions with it afterward. The report cites internal Meta documents and puts the monthly userbase at below 200,000 users. The same report found that most worlds created by players are never visited, and less than 9% have ever been visited by more than 50 people.

However, there are some worlds that are more frequently visited, such as The Soapstone Comedy Club, a user-created space for standup comedy that reports receiving up to 13,000 weekly visitors.

Controversies 
A February 2022 report by the Washington Post discussed concerns about children using Horizon Worlds despite the 18 or older age requirement arguing it could lead to the platform being used by sexual predators for child grooming, while also noting the platform currently lacks parental controls and has been criticized for alleged lax moderation on preventing underaged users from using the platform.

On 26 November 2021, a beta user reported being groped on Horizon Worlds, and that other users supported the conduct. Meta responded that there is a tool called "Safe Zone" that users can initiate to protect themselves from interactions with others. A second reported incident occurred in December 2021 when a female user claimed they were virtually gangraped by about 3 to 4 male users after joining the platform. In another incident, a female reporter from the Wall Street Journal was asked to expose herself by another user while trying to conduct interviews in the game. 

In February 2022 Meta, in response to the incidents, added a "personal boundary" to Horizon Worlds and Venues which creates an invisible boundary that can prevent users from coming within four feet of other avatars. Plans were also announced for users to change the size of this boundary in the future. The boundary feature is similar to standard features in competing platforms VRChat and Rec Room though with options to disable and change the size of the boundary already existing. Horizon World’s Safe Zone allows players to separate themselves from other players and their surroundings, as well as mute or block other players or certain types of content. In June 2022, Meta announced that it would roll out Voice Mode, a voice feature that allows users to garble incoming strangers’ audio to protect themselves from potentially harmful or unwanted speech.

Meta announced in October 2022 that legs would be among the first new updates to the graphics, as characters previously lacked any, however their initial reveal was criticized once it was discovered the models in the reveal were motion capture rather than being in-game footage.

Metaverse selfie 
On August 16, 2022, Mark Zuckerberg announced the release of Horizon Worlds in France and Spain on Facebook (also owned by Meta), with the message "We're launching Horizon Worlds in France and Spain today! Looking forward to seeing people explore and build immersive worlds, and to bringing this to more countries soon." Included with the post was an image depicting his avatar in front of interpretations of the Eiffel Tower (France) and Sagrada Família (Spain). The image quickly garnered mockery online, particularly on Twitter where it was criticized for its poor quality graphics in comparison to other video games; among these included comparisons with Second Life (2003), Twisted Metal 2 (1996), Fortnite (2017), and Miis, as well as generally finding the avatar dead-eyed or soulless.

On August 19, 2022, Mark Zuckerberg responded to the memes on Instagram writing "the photo I posted earlier this week was pretty basic — it was taken very quickly to celebrate at launch", but reassured players that the graphics of Horizon Worlds were capable of "so much more"; included with the post was a more modern render of his avatar, as well as an ancient Rome environment. Commentators had mixed opinions on the new render with Polygon stating "doesn’t exactly look like a place that’s appealing to spend time in, but I suppose that’s all in the eye of the beholder," while Kotaku felt it still "doesn’t look nearly as good as what you can find in other VR offerings."

References

External links

 Official website

Windows games
Oculus Rift games
Meta Quest games
Video games with cross-platform play
Video games developed in the United States
Early access video games
Free-to-play video games
Virtual reality games
Virtual reality communities
Multiplayer and single-player video games
Massively multiplayer online games
2021 video games
First-person video games
Video game development software
Video games with user-generated gameplay content
Social casual games
Cooperative video games